Khomeyni Shahr County is in Isfahan province, Iran. The capital of the county is the city of Khomeyni Shahr. At the 2006 census, the county's population was 282,888 in 57,551 households. The following census in 2011 counted 311,629 people in 90,715 households. At the 2016 census, the county's population was 319,727 in 98,269 households.

Administrative divisions

The population history and structural changes of Khomeyni Shahr County's administrative divisions over three consecutive censuses are shown in the following table. The latest census shows one district, two rural districts, and four cities.

References

 

Counties of Isfahan Province